Mohammad Aktar (born 2 August 1962) is an Afghan former wrestler, who competed at the 1980 Summer Olympics in the light-flyweight event.

References

External links

Wrestlers at the 1980 Summer Olympics
Afghan male sport wrestlers
Olympic wrestlers of Afghanistan
1962 births
Living people
Place of birth missing (living people)
20th-century Afghan people